In molecular biology, DAOA-AS1, DAOA antisense RNA 1 (non-protein coding), (formerly known as G30), is a human gene encoding a long non-coding RNA. It was originally identified in a screen for genes associated with schizophrenia. It is also associated with bipolar disorder and other psychiatric phenotypes. It may regulate the expression of the DAOA gene.

See also 
 D-amino acid oxidase activator
 Long non-coding RNA

References

Further reading 

 
 
 
 
 
 
 
 
 
 
 

Non-coding RNA
Biology of bipolar disorder